This is a list of the National Register of Historic Places listings in Harrison County, Texas.

This is intended to be a complete list of properties and districts listed on the National Register of Historic Places in Harrison County, Texas. There are one district and 17 individual properties listed on the National Register in the county. Thirteen individually listed properties are Recorded Texas Historic Landmarks of which two are State Antiquities Landmarks including one that is also a State Historic Site. The district contains additional Recorded Texas Historic Landmarks.

Current listings

The publicly disclosed locations of National Register properties and districts may be seen in a mapping service provided.

|}

See also

National Register of Historic Places listings in Texas
List of Texas State Historic Sites
Recorded Texas Historic Landmarks in Harrison County

References

External links

Registered Historic Places
Harrison County
Buildings and structures in Harrison County, Texas